Space Monster Wangmagwi is a 1967 South Korean kaiju film. It is the oldest surviving giant monster film to be made in South Korea and one of the all-Korean made science fiction film. It features a space variation on the plot to King Kong. It was inspired by Japanese kaiju films such as Godzilla as well as King Kong. Its 157,000 extras were among the most ever recruited for a film. After the film's theatrical release in South Korea, the film has been shown at Korean Film Archive screenings and has been available to view on computers on-site at the Korean Film Archive's library. In 2022 SRS Cinema licensed the film for home media distribution in the United States.

Plot

Although the plot resembles King Kong, the monster is described as resembling reptilians such as the film Creature from the Black Lagoon, one with large fangs from its two sets of jaws alongside claws on hands and feet with a box on its back. Aliens from another world seeking the conquest of Earth invade with flying saucers. They unleash a gigantic monster called Wangmagwi, who destroys everything in its path. The Air Force, led by ace pilot Ahn Hee, is dispatched, but can do little in such still heavily populated areas. Amidst the carnage, the Space Monster picks up Ahn Hee’s bride, Oh Jeong-hwan, carrying her along as it carries out the alien orders. However, when it tries to crush a young boy, named Spider, the kid evades the monster by scrambling up its arm and hitching a ride in the monster’s ear. He tortures it from within, cutting through its ear drum and, after finding a path to the nostrils, stabbing its inner nasal cavity. Eventually, Wangmagwi deploys a powerful death ray, melting entire buildings, forcing Ahn to finally take action. He executes a risky plan to save his bride and the boy, while hopefully stopping the beast once and for all.

Cast
 Nam Koong Won as Jeong-wan Oh
 Seon-kyeong Kim as Ahn-hee
 Sang-cheol Jeon as Street Urchin
 Eun-jin Han		
 Hie-gab Kim

Release

Critical response 
After watching the film at the 26th Fantasia International Film Festival, Christopher Stewardson of Our Culture Mag gave the film one and a half stars out of five, writing: "While not a good film, Space Monster Wangmagwi has its moments of weird delight. Its appeal may be illusive for most, but I’m glad it’s getting its moment in the sun."

See also
 List of South Korean films of 1967

References

External links
 

1967 films
South Korean science fiction films
1960s science fiction films
Giant monster films